Tudun Wada is an area in Kaduna South, in Kaduna state of Nigeria.

References

Local Government Areas in Kano State